Benjamin Talbot Daniel (born 18 November 2000) is a South African sailor. He competed in the 2020 Summer Olympics.

References

External links
 
 
 

2000 births
Living people
South African male sailors (sport)
Olympic sailors of South Africa
Sailors at the 2020 Summer Olympics – 49er
21st-century South African people
Sportspeople from Cape Town